The Archdeacon of Chesterfield was a senior ecclesiastical officer within the Diocese of Derby until 2022. Until 1927 the archdeaconry of Chesterfield was in the diocese of Southwell.

The Archdeacon was responsible for the disciplinary supervision of the clergy  within the seven area deaneries: Alfreton, Bakewell & Eyam, Bolsover & Staveley, Buxton, Chesterfield, Glossop, and Wirksworth.

The post was created in the Diocese of Southwell and from the Archdeaconry of Derby, by Order in Council on 18 October 1910; it became part of Derby diocese upon the new diocese's creation on 7 July 1927 and was held by the list below. 

The position was removed in 2022 by a Bishop's Order.

List of archdeacons
1910–1929 (ret.): Edmond Crosse
Chesterfield archdeaconry became part of the newly created Diocese of Derby in 1927.
1928–1934 (res.): Geoffrey Clayton (afterwards Bishop of Johannesburg, 1934)
1934–1963 (ret.): Talbot Dilworth-Harrison (afterwards archdeacon emeritus)
1963–1978 (res.): Ingram Cleasby (afterwards Dean of Chester, 1978)
1978–1996 (ret.): Gerald Phizackerley (afterwards archdeacon emeritus)
1996–2009 (ret.): David Garnett (afterwards archdeacon emeritus)
2010–22 October 2016 (res.): Christine Wilson
1 September 20162018: Tony Kaunhoven (Acting)
10 March 201812 June 2022: Carol Coslett

References

Anglican ecclesiastical offices
Lists of Anglicans
Lists of English people
Diocese of Derby